John Gabriel Walsh (March 25, 1879 – April 25, 1947) was a third baseman in Major League Baseball who played for the Philadelphia Phillies in the 1903 season. Listed at 5' 8" (1.73 m), 162 lb (73 k), he batted and threw right handed.

Born in Wilkes-Barre, Pennsylvania, Walsh attended Fordham University between 1898 and 1903 and University of Notre Dame in 1901. He went on to play Class C baseball in the minor leagues in 1902, starting with the Meriden Silverites of the  Connecticut State League before joining the Wilkes-Barre/Mount Carmel of the Pennsylvania State League during the midseason.

Afterwards, he was acquired by the Phillies and made his major league debut on  June 22, 1903.

Welsh made only one game appearance for Philadelphia and went hitless in three at-bats, but never returned to the majors.

Little was heard of Walsh until 1906, when he joined the Class B Waterbury Authors of the Connecticut State League.

He died in 1947 in Jamaica, New York at the age of 68.

Sources

See also
Cup of coffee

External links
Career statistics and player information from Baseball Reference, or Baseball Reference (minors), or Retrosheet, or The Baseball Cube

1879 births
1947 deaths
Baseball players from Pennsylvania
Fordham University alumni
Jackson Convicts players
Kalamazoo White Sox players
Major League Baseball third basemen
Meriden Silverites players
Philadelphia Phillies players
Sportspeople from Wilkes-Barre, Pennsylvania
University of Notre Dame alumni
Waterbury Authors players
Wilkes-Barre/Mount Carmel players